Cochin City Motor Thozhilali Union, a trade union of transportation worker in Cochin, India. CCMTU is affiliated to the Centre of Indian Trade Unions. The president of CCMTU is T.S. Shanmughadas.

Trade unions in India
Centre of Indian Trade Unions
Trade unions in Kerala
Organisations based in Kochi
Year of establishment missing